The Queens Royals men's basketball statistical leaders are individual statistical leaders of the Queens Royals men's basketball program in various categories, including points, assists, blocks, rebounds, and steals. Within those areas, the lists identify single-game, single-season, and career leaders. The Royals represent Queens University of Charlotte in the NCAA Division I ASUN Conference.

Queens began competing in intercollegiate basketball in 1989.  These lists are updated through the end of the 2021–22 season.

Scoring

Rebounds

Assists

Steals

Blocks

References

Lists of college basketball statistical leaders by team
Statistical